Michael V Kalaphates was Byzantine emperor for four months in 1041–1042. He was the nephew and successor of Michael IV and the adoptive son of Michael IV's wife Empress Zoe. He was popularly called "the Caulker" (Kalaphates) in accordance with his father's original occupation.

Family
Michael V was the son of a couple named Stephen and Maria. His birth date is not known, but is sometimes given as  1015, probably because he was considered "young" in 1035. Michael's mother was a sister of the Byzantine emperor Michael IV and Stephen had been a caulker before becoming an admiral under Michael IV and then botching an expedition to Sicily. Although the emperor preferred another of his nephews, the future Michael V was advanced as heir to the throne by his other uncle John the Orphanotrophos and the Empress Zoe. In 1035, Michael IV granted him the title of kaisar (caesar), and, together with Zoe, adopted his nephew as a son. Michael IV died on 10 December 1041 and Michael V was proclaimed emperor three days later by Zoe.

Reign

Determined to rule on his own, Michael V came into conflict with his uncle John the Orphanotrophos, whom he almost immediately banished to a monastery. Michael now reversed his uncle's decisions, recalling the nobles and courtiers who had been exiled during the previous reign, including the future patriarch Michael Keroularios and the general George Maniakes. Maniakes was promptly sent back to Southern Italy in order to contain the advance of the Normans.

On the night of 18 April to 19 April 1042, Michael V banished his adoptive mother and co-ruler Zoe, for plotting to poison him, to the island of Principo, thus becoming sole emperor. His announcement of the event in the morning led to a popular revolt; the palace was surrounded by a mob demanding Zoe's immediate restoration.  The demand was met, and Zoe was brought back, though still in a nun's habit. Presenting Zoe to the crowds in the Hippodrome did not quell the public's outrage over Michael's actions. The masses attacked the palace from multiple directions. The emperor's soldiers attempted to fight them off and by April 21, an estimated three thousand people from both sides had died. Once inside the palace, the mob pillaged valuables and tore up the tax rolls. Also on 21 April 1042 Zoe's sister Theodora, who had been removed from her nunnery against her will earlier in the uprising, was declared Empress. In response, Michael fled to seek safety in the monastery of the Stoudion together with his remaining uncle, Constantine. Although he had taken monastic vows, Michael was arrested, blinded and sent to a monastery.

See also

List of Byzantine emperors

References

Sources

Further reading
 Michael Psellus, Fourteen Byzantine Rulers, trans. E.R.A. Sewter (Penguin, 1966). 
 Michael Angold, The Byzantine empire 1025–1204 (Longman, 2nd edition, 1997). 
 Jonathan Harris, Constantinople: Capital of Byzantium (Hambledon/Continuum, 2007). 
The Oxford Dictionary of Byzantium (Oxford University Press, 1991) 

[aged 27]

Macedonian dynasty
11th-century Byzantine emperors
1010s births
1042 deaths
11th-century Byzantine monks
Studite monks
Dethroned monarchs